South Eastern Province was an electorate of the Victorian Legislative Council from November 1882. It was created in the redistribution of provinces in 1882 when the original provinces of Central and Eastern were abolished. The new South Eastern, South Yarra, North Yarra, North Eastern, North Central, Melbourne East, Melbourne North, Melbourne South and Melbourne West Provinces were then created.

The Legislative Council Act, 1881, created and defined the South Eastern Province as consisting of the following Divisions: Alexandra, Yea, Eltham, Lilydale, Bulleen, Boroondara, Nunawading, Malvern, Caulfield, Oakleigh, Moorabbin, Dandenong, Berwick, Cranbourne, Mornington, Flinders, Phillip Island and Brighton.

It was abolished at the 2006 state election in the wake of the Bracks Labor government's reform of the Legislative Council.

Members for South Eastern Province
These were members of the upper house province of the Victorian Legislative Council. Three members initially, two after the implementation in 1904 of the Electoral Provinces Boundaries Act 1903.

Election results

References

Former electoral provinces of Victoria (Australia)
1882 establishments in Australia
2006 disestablishments in Australia